Hamid Olimjon is a station of the Tashkent Metro on Chilonzor Line. This station is named after poet Hamid Olimjon.
The station vault type with two underground vestibules. It was opened on 18 August 1980 as part of the second section of Chilonzor Line, between October inkilobi and Maksim Gor'kiy.

On the station platform 9 luminaire made of white marble and glazes are mounted (painter I. Lipen).

References

Tashkent Metro stations
Railway stations opened in 1980